The Annals of Epidemiology is a monthly peer-reviewed journal devoted to epidemiological research and is published as the official journal for American College of Epidemiology. The journal was established in 1990 and is published by Elsevier. Its Editor-in-Chief is Patrick Sullivan (Emory University). According to the Journal Citation Reports, the journal has a 2020 impact factor of 3.797.

References

Epidemiology journals
Elsevier academic journals
Publications established in 1990
Academic journals associated with learned and professional societies